1 (Royal Buckinghamshire Yeomanry) Signal Squadron was a British Territorial Army Squadron of the Royal Corps of Signals.

History 
The squadron was formed at Bletchley on 1 April 1995 from a detachment of 5 Squadron of 39 Signal Regiment and 602 Signal Troop, perpetuating the traditions of the Royal Buckinghamshire Yeomanry from 20 October 1996, a title that had been dormant since the disbandment of B Company, 2nd Battalion Wessex Volunteers a decade earlier. The squadron left 39 Signal Regiment to become an independent unit on 1 July 1999.

Structure
The Squadron consisted of a Headquarters and three Signal troops:

Squadron Headquarters - located at Bletchley
899 (Royal Buckinghamshire Yeomanry) Signal Troop - located at Bletchley
805 (Queen's Own Oxfordshire Hussars) Signal Troop - located at Banbury
891 (Warwickshire) Signal Troop - located at Rugby

References

Army Reserve (United Kingdom)
Milton Keynes